Ramón Ledón González (born 23 February 1965) is a Cuban former professional boxer who competed from 1995 to 1999. He challenged for the IBF super featherweight title in 1998. One of the best amateur boxers of his era.

Amateur career 
As a member of the Cuban national team, Ledón won the bantamweight division at the 1984 Friendship Games held in Havana, Cuba.

Professional career 
In March 1998, Ledón destroyed John Bailey to get a shot at IBF Super Featherweight Champion Robert Garcia.

IBF Super Featherweight Championship 
On 24 October 1998, Ledón lost to Robert Garcia and his chance at the IBF Super Featherweight Champion in Trump Taj Mahal, Atlantic City, New Jersey.

References

External links 

Boxers from Havana
Welterweight boxers
1965 births
Living people
Cuban male boxers
20th-century Cuban people